The "self-elimination of Parliament" was a constitutional crisis in the First Austrian Republic caused by the resignation on March 4, 1933 of all three presidents of the National Council, the more powerful house of the Austrian Parliament. The law had no mechanism for the National Council to operate without a president, and Engelbert Dollfuss, the Chancellor, stated that Parliament had eliminated itself and that his government had the authority to rule by decree under emergency provisions dating from the First World War. This was a decisive step in the transition from a democratic republic to the fascist Federal State of Austria, as opposition attempts to reconstitute the National Council were unsuccessful.

Events of March 4, 1933 
When railway workers learned that their salaries were going to be paid in three installments, they went on strike on Wednesday, March 1, 1933. This was the subject of the heated debate in the National Council on March 4, 1933. There were three proposals. The proposal from the Christian Social Party, which was the majority at the time, was to impose disciplinary measures. The Greater German People's Party (GDVP) and the Social Democratic Workers' Party of Austria (SDAPÖ) were both against disciplinary measures in their proposals.

The proposal of the Social Democrats had 70 yes votes and 92 no votes and was therefore rejected. The proposal of the GDVP, however, was accepted with 81 yes votes and 80 no votes. At 8:40 pm the session was interrupted and then continued at 9:35 pm. It turned out that Abram cast one ballot for himself and another ballot, which carried Abram's name, for Scheibein, who was not in the room at the time when the voting process occurred. This resulted in an uproar and the Christian Socials demanded a new vote. Karl Renner, who saw himself incapable of continuing the session, resigned as president of the National Council to also be able to participate in next vote and therefore secure an additional vote for the Social Democrats. The second president Rudolf Ramek, a Christian Social, took over as Chairman. He declared that the previous vote was invalid and demanded that the vote should be repeated. This resulted in another uproar. Ramek stepped down as president and the third president Sepp Straffner from the GDVP became Chairman of the National Council before immediately stepping down. The resignation of Renner, Ramek and Straffner left the house without a president. Therefore, the session could not be closed and the National Council was incapable of acting. The Members left the chamber as consequence.

Dollfuss's interpretation 
The events of March 4, 1933 were an unexpected help for Dollfuss, who intended to rule as an authoritarian. Dollfuss declared that the parliament had "eliminated itself" and that this situation was a crisis "not provided for in the constitution". This gave the Chancellor the opportunity to establish an authoritarian government without a parliament. What appeared to be a "self-elimination of parliament" was, in fact, a coup d'état, since Dollfuss was determined to ensure that the National Council would never come together again.  On March 7, the federal government stated that it was not affected by the crisis and declared itself in power. It then announced that the "Wartime Economy Authority Law", an emergency law that was passed in 1917, would be used as a basis to rule. The first section of this law reads as follows:The government is empowered for the duration of the extraordinary conditions brought about by the war to make provision through decree for the necessary measures for promoting and revitalizing economic activities, for warding off economic damages, and supplying the population with food and other necessities.

Events of March 15, 1933 
On March 15, 1933, the Greater German People's Party (GDVP) and the Social Democratic Workers' Party of Austria (SDAPÖ) of Austria, which formed the opposition at that time, tried to continue the session that was aborted on March 4. They were, however, stopped by the Gendarmerie by order of the government and threatened the use of armed force. The resigning and third president of the National Council of the GDVP, Sepp Straffner, canceled his own withdrawal and was sitting with Members of the National Council for the SDAP and GDVP in the parliamentary chamber. The other Members of the National Council were not allowed in the parliament, which was surrounded by the law enforcement. The Members who were already in the parliament were escorted out by the police.

Role of Austrian President Wilhelm Miklas 
Over a million people signed a petition to ask then sitting Austrian President Wilhelm Miklas to recall the government of Dollfuss and initiate new elections to reinstate the National Council. The constitution gave Miklas the power to do so. However, the president did not act, which allowed Dollfuss to continue ruling without parliament.

Aftermath 
The liquidation of the Parliament furthered political tensions in the country. On 12 February 1934 SDAPÖ and its paramilitary wing (Republikanischer Schutzbund) started an armed rebellion against Dolfuss, which was later joined by the Communist Party of Austria (KPÖ), which had already been banned by the government in 1933 and was operating underground. The rebellion was quickly crushed by the Austrian Armed Forces and CS's paramilitary forces (Heimwehr and Ostmärkische Sturmscharen) and SDAPÖ and its affiliated trade unions were banned by the government.

In the following months, all political parties except the Christian Social Party were dissolved and the democratic constitution was replaced by a corporatist constitution modelled along the lines of Benito Mussolini's fascism (austrofascism). The Fatherland Front was later established, merging the Christian Social Party and right-wing paramilitary militia, establishing a one-party state which lasted until the annexation of Austria into the German Reich in 1938.

Legacy 
To ensure that the parliament would never "eliminate itself" again, a new law was introduced in 1975 that would give the position of Chairman to the oldest Member of the National Council, if the three presidents were not able to execute their duties as Chairmen.

References 

1933 in Austria
March 1933 events
Government crises
Constitutional crises
Political history of Austria